...Where the Shadows Lie is the first full-length album by the Finnish heavy metal band Battlelore, released in 2002. The album received good reviews and gained the band a loyal fan base. No singles were released from the album, although a video was filmed for the song "Journey to Undying Lands", used to promote the band throughout Europe. After the release of this album in 2002, guitarist Tommi Havo had to leave the band due to personal reasons and was replaced by Jussi Rautio.

The album cover features an image of Morgoth, painted by Ted Nasmith in 1998, titled “Morgoth and High King of Noldor” (used with permission).

Track listing

Personnel
Band members
Kaisa Jouhki – vocals
Patrik Mennander – vocals
Tommi Havo – guitar
Jyri Vahvanen – guitar
Miika Kokkola – bass
Henri Vahvanen – drums
Maria Honkanen – keyboards

Guest musicians
Jyrki Myllärinen – classical guitars

Production
Miitri Aaltonen - producer, engineer, mixing
Pauli Saastamoinen - mastering

Lyrical references
 "Swordmaster" describes the preparations for battle of a Rohirrim.
 "The Grey Wizard" is about the story of Gandalf up to The Two Towers.
 "Raging Goblin" makes references to the Goblin and Olog-hai races.
 "Journey to Undying Lands" tells the story of the land of Aman, final refuge of the Elves.
 "Shadowgate" is about Minas Morgul.
 "Fangorn" is about the Ents and their attack on Isengard.
 "The Green Maid" is about Lúthien Tinúviel.
 "Khazad-Dûm Pt. 1 (Ages of Mithril)" is about the dawn of Moria.
 "Ride with the Dragons" deals with Morgoth's creation of the dragons.

References

External links
 Battlelore Official Homepage

Battlelore albums
2002 debut albums
Napalm Records albums